Sylva may refer to:

Arts and entertainment
Sylva (Snarky Puppy album), 2015
Sylva, or A Discourse of Forest-Trees and the Propagation of Timber, a 1664 work by John Evelyn
Sylva, a 1960 novel by Jean Bruller
Sylva, A Tale of Thirty Three Trees, a novel 2020

People

People with the given name 
Sylva Ashworth (1874–1958), an American chiropractor
Sylva Kelegian (born 1962), American actress
Sylva Koscina (1933–1994), Italian actress
Sylva Langova (1921–2010), Czech actress
Sylva Lauerová (born 1962), a Czech writer and poet
Sylva Macharová (1893–1968), a Czech nurse
Sylva Stuart Watson (1894–1984), British theatre manager 
Sylva Zalmanson (born 1944), a Soviet-born Jewish activist, artist and engineer

People with the surname 
Buddy DeSylva (1895–1950), American songwriter
Carmen Sylva (1843–1916), German  writer and poet, nom de plume of Elisabeth of Wied, queen consort of Romania
Marguerite Sylva (1875–1957), Belgian mezzo-soprano
Rene Sylva (1929–2008), American botanist
Timipre Sylva (born 1964), Nigerian politician
Tony Sylva (born 1975), Senegalese footballer
Vincent Da Sylva (born 1973), Senegalese basketball player

Places
Sylva, North Carolina, U.S.
Sylva (river), Russia
Sylva, Perm Krai, Russia
Lake Sylva, on the campus of The College of New Jersey, U.S.

Other uses
Sylva Autokits, a British kit car manufacturer 
Sylva Foundation, a British tree and forestry charity

See also 

Silva (disambiguation)
Sylvanian Families, a line of collectible anthropomorphic animal figures made of flocked plastic